OnApp was a London, UK-based software company. Its software enabled service providers to build, operate and sell IaaS public cloud, private cloud and Content Delivery Network services. OnApp also operated the OnApp Federation, a wholesale cloud infrastructure marketplace, which enabled service providers to buy and sell cloud infrastructure managed by OnApp software; and enables enterprises to adopt a hybrid cloud model by combining their on-premises cloud infrastructure with public cloud resources.

OnApp was founded in 2010. On 16th August 2021, OnApp became a division of Virtuozzo.

List of products 
 OnApp Cloud  enables service providers to manage and sell different types of cloud hosting service. It includes a range of tools for server orchestration and virtual appliance management, and managing associated functions such as metering, monitoring, failover, backups, security, billing, user permissions and limits; plus Software Defined Networking and Software Defined Storage capabilities. OnApp Cloud is managed via a graphical user interface which is available for web browsers, iOS and Android devices; or via its REST API 
 Cloud.net provides OnApp cloud software and infrastructure as a service
 OnApp CDN enables service providers to create their own Content Delivery Network services
 OnApp Edge Accelerator is a patented, automated content optimization and distribution tool for web applications running on a virtual server in OnApp clouds
OnApp for VMware Cloud Director enables OnApp to be used as a management, provisioning and billing portal for VMware Cloud Director
OnApp for VMware vCenter enables OnApp to be used as a management, provisioning and billing portal for VMware vCenter environments
 OnApp Federation is a wholesale marketplace where service providers can buy and sell cloud infrastructure on demand

Partnerships 
OnApp partnerships include:
 VMware - OnApp is a VMware Technology Alliance Partner and a recommended VMware portal provider

Acquisitions 
On 8 August 2011 OnApp announced the acquisition of Aflexi, a CDN management software company

On 16 September 2014 OnApp announced the acquisition of SolusVM, a virtual server management software company. On 7 June 2018, SolusVM was acquired from OnApp by Plesk

On 16th August 2021, Virtuozzo announced that it had acquired OnApp.

References

External links
 Official OnApp website

Cloud computing providers
Cloud infrastructure